Queensferry (now called South Queensferry) in Linlithgowshire was a royal burgh that returned one commissioner to the Parliament of Scotland and to the Convention of Estates.

After the Acts of Union 1707, Queensferry, Culross, Dunfermline, Inverkeithing and Stirling formed the Stirling district of burghs, returning one member between them to the House of Commons of Great Britain.

List of burgh commissioners

 1661–63, 1665 convention, 1667 convention, 1669–74, 1678 convention: Archibald Wilson, bailie 
 1685–86: John Rule, bailie 
 1689 (convention), 1689–1701, 1702–04: Sir William Hamilton of Whytelaw, senator (died c.1704)
 1705–07: Sir James Stewart of Goodtrees

References

See also
 List of constituencies in the Parliament of Scotland at the time of the Union

Burghs represented in the Parliament of Scotland (to 1707)
Politics of West Lothian
History of West Lothian
Constituencies disestablished in 1707
1707 disestablishments in Scotland